Grigore Ioan Turda (born 30 July 1997) is a Romanian professional footballer who plays as a centre back for Liga I side FC Argeș Pitești. In his career, Turda also played for teams such as: Foresta Suceava or Pandurii Târgu Jiu, among others.

References

External links
 
 

1996 births
Living people
People from Sighetu Marmației
Romanian footballers
Association football defenders
Liga I players
Liga II players
Liga III players
ACS Foresta Suceava players
FC Zalău players
CS Pandurii Târgu Jiu players
FC Argeș Pitești players